Cloncorrick is a heritage-listed house located in Darling Point, a suburb of Sydney, in New South Wales, Australia. It was built in 1884 for Sir George Bowen Simpson to a design by John Horbury Hunt in the Victorian Free Gothic style. Simpson named the house after Cloncorrick Castle in Ireland, where his grandfather once lived. The home was the residence of several notable Australians and is considered to be a house of local historic significance. It has been converted into two apartments.

Heritage listing
On 2 April 1999 was listed on the Woollahra Council local government list of the New South Wales Heritage Database with the following statement of significance:

Owners

Sir George and Lady Simpson

George Bowen Simpson was born in 1838 near Parramatta. His father was Pierce Simpson, a police magistrate, and his mother was Hester Elizabeth MacNeill. George was educated at Kings School, Parramatta, and was admitted to the bar in 1858.

In 1861 Simpson married Martha Margaret Cobcroft, who was the daughter of Enoch Cobcroft of Cumberland Hall, East Maitland. The couple had two children, a boy and a girl; both died when they were young. The daughter was only fifteen when she died and the son was 34. They had no immediate heirs.

Simpson became a very successful lawyer and in 1867 was made a district court judge. In 1885 he became a politician in the New South Wales Legislative Council and soon became attorney-general. In 1894 he became a judge of the Supreme Court. In 1909 he was knighted but because of poor health he retired in 1910. He spent his remaining years at Cloncorrick, and he died in 1915.

His wife Martha continued to live at Cloncorrick after his death. One of her main interests was the work done at St Marks Church, Darling Point. After she died at age 90 in 1933 a memorial plaque was erected in memory of both Sir George and Lady Simpson at St Marks Church, which can still be seen today.

Because they had no immediate heirs, their grandson Julian Simpson inherited the estate, and he sold Cloncorrick in 1934 to Esther Holt.

Esther Jane Holt

Esther Jane Holt was the widow of Walter Henry Holt, a former wealthy pastoralist who had died in 1916. Esther had been born in Wales in 1867; her maiden name was Davies. She married Walter Holt in 1892 and the couple had lived at Glanwyre in Manly, which was a very large mansion and estate. They had four children, the eldest of whom was Sophia. When Walter died, Esther subdivided the Glanwyre estate and therefore had a substantial amount of money.

When Esther bought Cloncorrick in 1934, the house was described in the real estate advertisement in the following terms:

Esther’s daughter Sophia had married Aubrey Curtis, a Queensland pastoralist but unfortunately he died in 1927, leaving her a widow. When Ester bought Cloncorrick, Sophia lived with her mother for some years. Esther died at Cloncorrick in 1948, aged 81. In her will she left a substantial donation to St Marks Church, Darling Point, and also to several other charities.

Herbert and Meredith Lloyd

Herbert William Lloyd was born in 1883 in South Yarra, Melbourne. His father, William, was a police officer. He was educated at Wesley College, and in 1910 he joined the military forces. Lloyd married Meredith Pleasents in May 1914. Meredith was born in 1890 in Euroa, Victoria. She was the daughter of William Benjamin Pleasents and Ada Pleasents (née Watt).

A few months after they were married, the First World War began and Lloyd went to Egypt. In the following year he was at Gallipoli, where he was promoted to the rank of major. For his conduct during the Gallipoli Campaign he received the DSO. During the rest of the war he was awarded other distinctions. When the war ended, he remained in the military until 1925. In 1929 he became a politician in the New South Wales Legislative Assembly and remained there until 1941.

When the Second World War commenced, Lloyd again entered the military forces and this time was promoted to major general. In 1946, after the war, he retired. Shortly before his retirement his son Mick Lloyd married at St Marks Church, Darling Point, and a photo of his wedding was in the Australian Women’s Weekly.

After his retirement Herbert became a resident of Cloncorrick, and his wife, Meredith, died there in 1952. After her death Lloyd continued to live at the house for some time. In 1957 he died at the age of 74. He was cremated with Anglican rites and military honours.

See also

Australian residential architectural styles
List of historic houses in New South Wales

References

External links

Gothic Revival architecture in Sydney
Victorian architecture in Sydney
John Horbury Hunt buildings
1884 establishments in Australia
Houses completed in 1884
New South Wales places listed on the defunct Register of the National Estate
New South Wales Heritage Database
Houses in Darling Point, New South Wales
New South Wales State Heritage Register